Horabagridae is a proposed family of catfishes containing three genera, Horabagrus, Platytropius and Pseudeutropius. Horobagrus has been more usually assigned to the family Bagridae and sometimes it has been suggested it is closer to the Schilbeidae which is where the other two genera have been more conventionally placed.

References

 
Fish of Asia
Catfish families